Brad Martin (born August 12, 1986)  is a Canadian snowboarder who specializes in the halfpipe. Martin was born and resides in Hamilton, Ontario, currently in the west Hamilton area of Ancaster.

Career
In 2006, he finished 16th in the halfpipe event at the Olympics. He won a bronze medal at the 2007 FIS Snowboarding World Championships. On February 29, 2008, he won his first world cup event. He has been the Canadian champion in the halfpipe for three straight years, winning in 2007, 2008 and 2009.

On January 25, 2010, he was one of 18 athletes announced to the Olympic snowboard team. He will compete in the halfpipe.

References

External links
 
 National Team Profile
 CTV Olympic Profile
 

1986 births
Living people
Canadian male snowboarders
Snowboarders at the 2006 Winter Olympics
Snowboarders at the 2010 Winter Olympics
Snowboarders at the 2014 Winter Olympics
Olympic snowboarders of Canada
Sportspeople from Hamilton, Ontario